Bob and Marcia were a Jamaican vocal duo, that consisted of Bob Andy and Marcia Griffiths. They had a #5 UK hit single in 1970 with "Young, Gifted and Black". They followed up with "Pied Piper", which peaked at #11 in the UK Singles Chart in 1971. Those two releases spent a total of twenty five weeks in that chart in a period of less than eighteen months. They discontinued their partnership in the mid-1970s, both feeling that it was not bringing them adequate financial reward.

Discography

Albums

Singles

Notes

References

Jamaican musical duos
Trojan Records artists
Male–female musical duos